Parno Graszt is a Roma music ensemble from Paszab, Hungary founded in 1987. "Parno Grast" means "white horse" in the Romani language, with "graszt" using the Hungarian orthography 'sz' for 's'. In the Roma culture white is symbol of purity and horse is a symbol of freedom. Their debut album Hit the piano reached Number 7 on the World Music Chart Europe in October 2002. Hungarian Television and the BBC produced in 2004 a music documentary about Parno Graszt. After their second album, Járom az utam (2004), Parno Graszt was voted in the top 10 for "best artist of year", 2005, by the Swiss music magazine Vibrations. In 2016, they competed in A Dal, the national final selection for Hungary in the Eurovision Song Contest with the song Már nem szédülök, and reached the final.

Members 
 József Oláh (vocals, guitar, tambura)
 Géza Balogh (vocals, guitar, dance)
 Viktor Oláh (vocals, guitar, dance)
 Sándor Horváth (vocals, spoons, dance)
 János Jakocska (vocals, guitar)
 Mária Váradi (vocals, dance)
 Mária Balogh (vocals, dance)
 Krisztián Oláh (accordion)
 János Oláh (double bass)
 István Németh (oral bass, churn)

Discography 
 Rávágok a zongorára (2002) (Hit the Piano)
 Járom az utam (2004) (I'm On My Way) 
 Ez a világ nekem való (2007) (This World Is Made for Me)
 Reggelig mulatok (2011) (I Revel Till the Break of Dawn)

References

External links 
 Official site
 MySpace Site
 Traditional Gypsy music from Hungary
 Tom & Jerry- Parno Graszt original by youtube

Hungarian Romani musical groups
Hungarian folk music groups
Musical groups established in 1987
Romani-language bands